The 1987 World Rally Championship was the 15th season of the Fédération Internationale de l'Automobile (FIA) World Rally Championship (WRC).  The season consisted of 13 rallies in the same venues of the previous season.  The only alteration to the schedule was the move of the Olympus Rally from December to June on the calendar.

1987 marked the beginning of a new era for the WRC, as it was the first season driven without the powerful and popular Group B rally cars, seeing the Group A cars come to the forefront of the world stage and the institution of championships not only for manufacturers and drivers, but also drivers of production and two-wheel drive cars. Group A would remain at the forefront of the championship for ten years, where a new specification, World Rally Car were made standard in 1997.  The FIA also changed the basic scoring rules for manufacturers although they retained the policy of having two rallies not count toward manufacturers totals.  New Zealand and the Ivory Coast were selected in 1987 to count solely for drivers' titles.

Martini Lancia proved most successful in adjusting to the new lower-powered cars, adopting the Lancia Delta HF 4WD, driven by Finns Juha Kankkunen and Markku Alén as well as Italian Miki Biasion.  Between the three, Lancia would gather nine rally wins over the thirteen race season, dominating the manufacturers' race for the championship.  Meanwhile, the three drivers split success between them, placing closely in the top three places for the drivers' title by the end of the season.

Audi Sport retained both Hannu Mikkola and Walter Röhrl, although they could not duplicate the success of their Group B seasons, both placing well down in the drivers' title competition. Audi however did gain some points from others team running the Quattro. Clarion Team Europe with driver Per Eklund contributed 26 points to the work's effort while Mig Linz's entry, Georg Fischer added another eight, bolstering Audi's bid for second overall.

The Philips Renault Elf team struggled through the season with the Group A Renault 11 Turbo.  French drivers Jean Ragnotti and François Chatriot were unable to gain much success, with the highlight of their season coming at Portugal with Ragnotti's second-place finish.

Volkswagen Motorsport followed their success of the previous season with Swede Kenneth Eriksson, the 1986 winner of the championship for drivers of Group A cars.  Eriksson was able to place fourth overall on the season, beaten only by Lancia drivers. Volkswagen, lacking a major second driver, was surpassed by not only Lancia, but Audi and Renault as well in the manufacturer standings.

Ford Motor Company made its return to serious competition by enlisting drivers Ari Vatanen and Stig Blomqvist, but struggled early on with the Sierra XR 4x4.  The car was dropped, its replacement on the works team coming in the end of the season in the form of the redesigned Sierra RS Cosworth, which met with much greater success, challenging the dominant Lancias in the final three events of the season.



Teams and drivers

Schedule and results

Championship for manufacturers

Championship for drivers

Sources

See also 
 1987 in sports

External links

 FIA World Rally Championship 1987 at ewrc-results.com

World Rally Championship
World Rally Championship seasons